Protein Source of the Future...Now! is the first in a three-part series of compilations by the Mountain Goats, released in 1999 by Ajax Records. The two compilations that follow Protein Source of the Future...Now! are Bitter Melon Farm and Ghana.

Notes
The album's title is derived from the book The Book of Tofu: Protein Source of the Future...Now! by William Shurtleff and Akiko Aoyagi.

Track listing

Personnel
 John Darnielle - vocals, guitar, keyboard

References

The Mountain Goats compilation albums
1999 compilation albums